Changes is the ninth studio album by the Monkees. The album was issued after Michael Nesmith's exit from the band, leaving only Micky Dolenz and Davy Jones to fulfill the recording contract they had signed in the mid-1960s. Changes was their last new album for Colgems Records and the group's last album of all new material until Pool It!, released in 1987.

History
The album's title had originally been considered for the Monkees' movie (released in 1968), and a song with that title (cowritten by Jones with Steve Pitts) had been recorded. The movie was retitled Head, however, and the song was subsequently shelved, remaining unreleased until 1990, when it appeared on the archival compilation album Missing Links Volume Two.

Changes reunited Davy Jones and Micky Dolenz with producer Jeff Barry, who now had his own successful record label, Steed Records. As with the earliest Monkees recordings, Jones and Dolenz provided only their vocals, despite the album cover featuring them playing percussion, while the backing tracks were provided by session musicians. Several of the songs selected for the album were outtakes from previous album sessions: Barry resurrected his own produced outtake of his composition "99 Pounds" from the final Don Kirshner-supervised Monkees sessions in January 1967 that also yielded the hit single "A Little Bit Me, A Little Bit You"; Micky's "Midnight Train" was recorded during sessions for The Monkees Present and had been featured in CBS-TV reruns of The Monkees television show (most notably in "The Chaperone"); "I Never Thought It Peculiar," with vocals by Jones, was written by frequent Monkees collaborators Tommy Boyce and Bobby Hart and was recorded during the sessions for More of the Monkees (1967).

Jones later stated that Changes was his least favorite Monkees effort, going so far as to comment in the 1994 Rhino Records CD version's liner notes that the album "was Jeff Barry and Andy Kim doing an Andy Kim album," adding that he had terrible memories of the recording sessions. Dolenz, while not lavishing praise on Changes, said that he was pleased to be invited to record new material. "I was quite happy to do it as long as somebody wanted to record me. It was simple as that." Dolenz added, "by that time, it was pretty obvious that the Monkees were over. Davy and I were still getting along, but we were mainly fulfilling a contractual obligation to a record company — that's what Changes is all about".

Release
"Oh My My" became the first single from the album and made the Top 100 in the Billboard charts. Written by Barry and Kim, it is unrelated to the later 1973 Ringo Starr single of the same name. In addition to being the album's opening track and lead-off single, "Oh My My" was also accompanied by a rare promo film directed by Dolenz, showing him and Jones riding their motorcycles and horses. "Acapulco Sun" was released as a single in Mexico, becoming a minor hit there.

Changes appeared in June 1970 and initially failed to make the charts. Consequently, its initial pressing (COS-119) was limited and has become one of the more valuable Monkees albums. Jones announced shortly after its release that he was resuming his solo career, but he and Dolenz would release one more single together before reuniting with Boyce and Hart in 1976 as Dolenz, Jones, Boyce & Hart. In the wake of the success of the Monkees' television show being rebroadcast on Saturday mornings by CBS (in which all but two tracks from Changes were featured in the reruns), the duo recorded "Do It in the Name of Love" and "Lady Jane" in September 1970. Instead of appearing under the "Monkees" name on Colgems Records, however, the single was released on Bell Records, the successor label to Colgems, and was credited to "Mickey Dolenz  and Davy Jones". This was due to the prohibitive costs of licensing the Monkees name in the US; however, in Japan, the record was issued under the name "the Monkees".

Like all of the original Monkees albums from 1966 to 1970, Changes was reissued in September 1986 by Rhino Records (RNLP-70148) and made a belated entry into the Billboard album charts, reaching No. 152. The Rhino vinyl reissue was transferred from a vinyl copy of the album, the master tape having been lost over the years. For the 1994 CD reissue on Rhino, a first-generation master tape was used, which had been found at the Screen Gems publishing division.

Session outtakes
"Time and Time Again", a track written by Jones and Bill Chadwick and recorded in 1969, was originally slated to be on the album but was ultimately not chosen. The track later surfaced on the 1987 Monkees rarities collection Missing Links and again in remixed form as a bonus track on the 1994 CD release of Changes.

Another song, "Steam Engine", was recorded in 1969 and was written and produced by Chip Douglas, featuring Dolenz on vocals. The song was not released at the time, due to a disagreement between Screen Gems and Douglas over session costs, and only saw the light of day via a Saturday morning rerun of the Monkees' TV series episode "Monkees on Tour". In 1979, it was finally issued on the semi-official Australian compilation album Monkeemania - 40 Timeless Hits, and in 1982 it was issued in the USA on the Rhino picture disc compilation Monkee Business.

Two known outtakes from the sessions—"Ride Baby Ride" and "Which Way Do You Want It"—were thought to be lost as of the release of the 1994 Rhino CD. On February 17, 2023, the latter was unveiled during the "Jeff Barry & The Monkees" event in Los Angeles, featuring Barry in conversation with Monkees historian Andrew Sandoval and broadcast online over Zoom.

"Shake 'Em Up", a 1968 outtake from the sessions for The Birds, the Bees & the Monkees, written by Jerry Leiber and Mike Stoller and sung by Dolenz, was offered up for consideration to be included on Changes but was ultimately rejected by Barry in favor of new material. It was first issued in 1996 on another Monkees rarities collection, Missing Links Volume Three.

Track listing

Original 1970 Colgems vinyl issue

Notes
All tracks except "You're So Good to Me" and "It's Got to Be Love" were dubbed into the CBS reruns of The Monkees from 1970–1972.

1994 Rhino CD reissue

Tracks 1-12: Original album

Session information

"Oh My My"
Written by Jeff Barry and Andy Kim
Lead vocal by Micky Dolenz
Other personnel unknown
Produced and arranged by Jeff Barry
Engineered by Mike Moran
Recorded in New York City, February 5, 1970
Issued as Colgems Records 45 RPM single 5011, April 1970 (No. 98)

"Ticket on a Ferry Ride"
Written by Jeff Barry and Bobby Bloom
Lead vocal by Micky Dolenz
Other personnel unknown
Produced and arranged by Jeff Barry
Engineered by Mike Moran
Recorded in New York City, March 25, 1970

"You're So Good to Me"
Written by Jeff Barry and Bobby Bloom
Lead vocal by Davy Jones
Other personnel unknown
Produced and arranged by Jeff Barry
Engineered by Mike Moran
Recorded in New York City, March 25, 1970
While Jeff Barry and Bobby Bloom are officially credited as the writers of the song, several sites and sources credit Robert Stone as co-writer. These findings are incorrect, as the song "You're So Good" by Robert Stone which was recorded by the Monkees in 1969 is a completely different song from the one co-written by Barry and Bloom.

"It's Got to Be Love"
Written by Neil Brian Goldberg
Lead vocal by Micky Dolenz
Other personnel unknown
Produced and arranged by Jeff Barry
Engineered by Mike Moran
Recorded in New York City, April 2, 1970

"Acapulco Sun"
Written by Ned Albright and Steven Soles
Lead vocal by Micky Dolenz
Other personnel unknown
Produced and arranged by Jeff Barry
Engineered by Mike Moran
Recorded in New York City, April 2, 1970

"99 Pounds"
Written by Jeff Barry
Lead vocal by Davy Jones
Backing vocals: Unknown
Guitars: Al Gorgoni, Don Thomas and Hugh McCracken 
Bass: Lou Mauro
Drums: Herb Lovelle 
Clavinet: Stan Free 
Organ: Arthur Butler
Tambourine: Thomas Cerone
Handclaps: Unknown
Produced and arranged by Jeff Barry 
Engineered by Ray Hall
Recorded at RCA Studio B, New York City, January 21 (11:00 A.M. - 7:00 P.M.), and February 4 and 6, 1967, during the final Don Kirshner-supervised Monkees sessions for what would become known as Headquarters (1967)

"Tell Me Love"
Written by Jeff Barry
Lead vocal by Micky Dolenz
Other personnel unknown
Produced and arranged by Jeff Barry
Engineered by Mike Moran
Recorded in New York City, February 5, 1970

"Do You Feel It Too?"
Written by Jeff Barry and Andy Kim
Lead vocal by Davy Jones
Other personnel unknown
Produced and arranged by Jeff Barry
Engineered by Mike Moran
Recorded in New York City, March 26, 1970

"I Love You Better"
Written by Jeff Barry and Andy Kim
Lead vocal by Micky Dolenz
Backing vocals: Davy Jones & unknown
Guitar: Hugh McCracken
Bass: Chuck Rainey
Drums: Gary Chester
Unknown: Ned Albright, Bobby Bloom, Andy Kim and Steven Soles
Produced and arranged by Jeff Barry
Engineered by Mike Moran
Recorded in New York City, February 5, 1970
Issued as Colgems Records 45 RPM single 5011, April 1970 (No. 98)

"All Alone in the Dark"
Written by Ned Albright and Steven Soles
Lead vocal by Micky Dolenz
Harmony vocal: Davy Jones
All others unknown
Produced and arranged by Jeff Barry
Engineered by Mike Moran
Recorded in New York City, March 26, 1970

"Midnight Train"
Written by Micky Dolenz 
Lead vocal by Micky Dolenz
Backing vocals: Micky Dolenz and Coco Dolenz
Electric Guitar: Louie Shelton
Bass: Joe Osborn
Banjo: James Burton
Drums: Hal Blaine
Harmonica: Tommy Morgan
Produced by Micky Dolenz
Recorded at RCA Victor Studios, Hollywood, CA, July 16 (7:00 P.M. - 10:00 P.M.), 1969, during the sessions for The Monkees Present (1969)
While Micky Dolenz is officially credited as the writer of the song, several sites and sources claim Chris McCarty, Kenny Lee Lewis and Steve Miller to have co-written the track. These findings are incorrect, as the song co-written by McCarty, Lewis, and Miller is a completely different song from the one written by Dolenz.

"I Never Thought It Peculiar"
Written by Tommy Boyce and Bobby Hart
Lead vocal by Davy Jones
Backing vocals: Tommy Boyce, Bobby Hart and Ron Hicklin
Guitars: Wayne Erwin, Gerry McGee and Louie Shelton
Acoustic Guitar: Tommy Boyce
Bass: Larry Taylor
Drums: Billy Lewis
Violins: Harold Ayres, John DeVoogdt, Jimmy Getzoff, Joy Lule and Norman Serkin
Violas: William Hymanson and Gareth Nuttycombe
Cello: Frederick Seykora
Saxophone: Jay Migliori
Trumpet: Chuck Findley
French Horn: Alan Robinson
Trombone: Dick Hyde
Bell: Gene Estes
Unknown: Michael Anthony
Produced by Tommy Boyce and Bobby Hart
Arranged by Jimmie Haskell
Recorded at RCA Victor Studios, Hollywood, October 28, 1966, during the sessions for More of the Monkees (1967), with further recording done at The Sound Factory, Hollywood, September 5 (12:00 P.M. - 3:00 P.M.) and 12 (1:00 P.M. - 5:30 P.M.), 1969

Bonus tracks session information

"Time and Time Again"
Written by Bill Chadwick and Davy Jones
Lead vocal by Davy Jones
Backing vocals: Davy Jones and Bill Chadwick
Electric Guitar: Louie Shelton and unknown
Bass: Joe Osborn
Drums: John Guerin
Moog Synthesizer: Paul Beaver
Calliope: Michel Rubini
Produced by Bill Chadwick and Davy Jones
Recorded at RCA Victor Studios, Hollywood, CA, August 14, and November 11, 1969, during the sessions for The Monkees Present 
Originally considered for, but rejected from, Changes 
First released on Missing Links in 1987. The mix presented here is slightly different than on Missing Links. The opening and ending dialogues are removed and the song fades out at the end, whereas the mix on Missing Links does not fade out. The Moog also doesn't appear in this mix until the instrumental bridge, whereas the Moog can be heard throughout the song in the mix on Missing Links. The Moog is also more restrained in this mix than on Missing Links.

"Do It in the Name of Love"
Written by Bobby Bloom and Neil Brian Goldberg
Lead vocals by Micky Dolenz and Davy Jones
Backing vocals: Micky Dolenz, Davy Jones and unknown
Guitar: Unknown
Drums: Unknown
Piano: Unknown
Keyboard: Unknown
Tambourine: Unknown
Produced and arranged by Jeff Barry
Recorded in New York City, September 22, 1970
Issued as Bell Records 45 RPM single 986, April 1971

"Lady Jane"
Written by Bobby Bloom and Neil Brian Goldberg
Lead vocals by Davy Jones and Micky Dolenz
Backing vocals: Micky Dolenz, Davy Jones and unknown
Acoustic Guitar: Unknown
Drums: Unknown
Piano: Unknown
Keyboard: Unknown
Tambourine: Unknown
Produced and arranged by Jeff Barry
Recorded in New York City, September 22, 1970
Issued as Bell Records 45 RPM single 986, April 1971

Charts

References

The Monkees albums
1970 albums
RCA Records albums
Rhino Records albums
Colgems Records albums
Albums produced by Micky Dolenz
Albums produced by Davy Jones (musician)
Albums produced by Tommy Boyce
Albums produced by Bobby Hart
Albums produced by Jeff Barry